André Giamarchi (24 July 1931 – 25 September 2012) was a French footballer. He competed in the men's tournament at the 1960 Summer Olympics.

References

External links
 
 

1931 births
2012 deaths
French footballers
Olympic footballers of France
Footballers at the 1960 Summer Olympics
Sportspeople from Skikda
Association football forwards
FC Annecy players